The 2007 World Modern Pentathlon Championships were held in Berlin, Germany from August 18 to August 21.

Medal summary

Men's events

Women's events

See also
Modern Pentathlon at the 2008 Summer Olympics
World Modern Pentathlon Championship

References

 Sport123

Modern pentathlon in Europe
World Modern Pentathlon Championship
World Modern Pentathlon Championship
International sports competitions hosted by Germany
Sports competitions in Berlin